Oberea mauritanica is a species of beetle in the family Cerambycidae. It was described by Hippolyte Lucas in 1888. It is known from Algeria.

References

Beetles described in 1888
mauritanica